Steve Marriott (1947–1991) was a successful and versatile English blue-eyed soul, singer-songwriter and guitarist.  He is best remembered for his uniquely powerful voice and aggressive guitar in groups Small Faces (1965–1969) and Humble Pie (1969–1975).  In England, Marriott became a popular often photographed mod style icon through his role as lead singer and guitarist with the Small Faces in the mid to late sixties.
Marriott's music was influenced from an early age by his heroes Buddy Holly, Booker T & the MG's, Ray Charles, Otis Redding, Muddy Waters, Bobby Bland and later the Rolling Stones.  Marriott posthumously received an Ivor Novello Award in 1996 for his Outstanding Contribution to British Music and listed in Mojo magazine (sister magazine to Q) as one of the top 100 greatest singers of all time.

Album discography

Pre-Small Faces single
"Give Her My Regards"/"Imaginary Love" (Label Decca) 7" released 1963

Post-Humble Pie singles
"Star in my Life"/"Midnight Rolling" (Label:A&M) 7" Released:1976 
"Star in my Life"/"East Side Strutting" (Label:A&M) 7" Released:1976 Netherlands
"Star in my Life" (one side mono/one side stereo) (Label:A&M) 7" Released:1976 USA
"Lookin' for a Love"/"Kayoed by Love" (Label:Atlantic) 7" Released:1977 - Small Faces MK II
"Stand by Me (Stand by You)"/"Hungry and Looking" (Label:Atlantic) 7" Released:1977 – Small Faces MK II
"Filthy Rich"/"Over too Soon" (Label:Atlantic) 7" Released:1978 – Small Faces MK II
"Whatcha Gonna Do About It"/"All Shook Up" (Label:Aura) 7" Released:1985 – Packet of Three
"All or Nothing"/"Clapping Song" (Label:Possum) 7" Released:1989 Australia
"The Um Um Um Um Um Song (The Um Um Song)"/"I Never Loved a Woman (The Way I Love You)" (Label:Trax) 7" Released:1989
"Poll Tax Blues" (Label:Celtic) 7" (Released:1990) – The Pollcats

Steve Marriott Interview
Released: 2002 MOLCD45 
Rare interview with Steve Marriott conducted in April 1976.

See also
The Small Faces discography
Humble Pie (band)
Steve Marriott
Steve Marriott - All Too Beautiful...

References/Notes
Notes:

References:

Paolo Hewitt John Hellier (2004). Steve Marriott - All Too Beautiful....  Helter Skelter Publishing  .
Paolo Hewitt/Kenney Jones (1995) small faces the young mods' forgotten story – Acid Jazz

External links
– Steve Marriott discography

Discographies of British artists
Rhythm and blues discographies